Santiago René Muñoz Robles (born 14 August 2002) is a professional footballer who plays as a forward for Liga MX club Santos Laguna. Born in the United States, he represents the Mexico national under-23 team.

Club career

Santos Laguna
Muñoz made his professional debut with Santos Laguna under manager Guillermo Almada on 25 October 2020 in a Liga MX match against Atlético San Luis, coming on as a substitute, winning 2–1.

Newcastle United (loan)
On 31 August 2021, Muñoz joined Premier League side Newcastle United on an 18-month loan deal, linking up with the club's academy sides with the English club having the option to make the deal permanent. On 30 July 2022, Muñoz made his senior team debut for Newcastle in a 2–1 pre-season friendly win against Athletic Bilbao; coming on as a late substitute alongside fellow academy player Lucas De Bolle.

International career

Youth
Muñoz was part of the under-17 squad that participated at the 2019 CONCACAF U-17 Championship, scoring five goals, where Mexico won the competition. He also participated at the 2019 U-17 World Cup, where Mexico finished runner-up.

Muñoz was called up to the under-23 team by Jaime Lozano to participate at the 2020 CONCACAF Olympic Qualifying Championship, appearing in three matches, where Mexico won the competition.

Muñoz was included in the under-21 roster that participated in the 2022 Maurice Revello Tournament, scoring two goals, Mexico finished third.

Career statistics

Club

Honours
Mexico U17
CONCACAF U-17 Championship: 2019
FIFA U-17 World Cup runner-up: 2019

Mexico U23
CONCACAF Olympic Qualifying Championship: 2020

Individual
FIFA U-17 World Cup Goal of the Tournament: 2019

References

2002 births
Living people
Mexican footballers
Mexico youth international footballers
Mexican expatriate footballers
American soccer players
American sportspeople of Mexican descent
Association football forwards
Liga MX players
Santos Laguna footballers
Newcastle United F.C. players
Soccer players from Texas
Sportspeople from El Paso, Texas
Mexican expatriate sportspeople in England
Expatriate footballers in England